Perception is an American crime drama created by Kenneth Biller & Mike Sussman, which aired on TNT from July 9, 2012, through March 17, 2015. The series stars Eric McCormack as Dr. Daniel J. Pierce, a schizophrenic neuropsychiatrist and college professor, who is enlisted by the FBI to assist on some of their most complex cases.

Series overview

{| class="wikitable" style="text-align:center;"
|-
! style="padding: 0px 8px" colspan="2" rowspan="2" |Season
! style="padding: 0px 8px" rowspan="2" |Episodes
! style="padding: 0px 8px" colspan="2" |Originally aired 
|-
! First aired
! Last aired
|-
| style="background:#CCCCCC; color:#100; text-align:center;"| 
| [[List of Perception episodes#Season 1 (2012)|1]]
| 10
| 
|  
|-
| style="background:#9999CC; color:#100; text-align:center;"| 
| [[List of Perception episodes#Season 2 (2013–14)|2]]
| 14
| 
|  
|-
| style="background:#E9D241; color:#100; text-align:center;"| 
| [[List of Perception episodes#Season 3 (2014–15)|3]]
| 15
| 
| 
|}

Episodes

Season 1 (2012)

Season 2 (2013–14)

Season 3 (2014–15)

References

External links

Lists of American crime drama television series episodes